Eliot & Me is a 2012 Irish drama film. The plot follows the adventures of a young girl trying to find her dog in Dublin. The film is directed by Fintan Connolly and features his then 10-year-old daughter Ella Connolly in the lead role.

Plot 
Dublin. The present. Ten-year-old Lucy struggles to come to terms with her parents' separation. She adopts a dog, Eliot, from the local dog shelter. It is love at first sight and her life starts to improve. But tragedy strikes when Eliot goes missing and Lucy undertakes a dangerous journey to find him.

Tagline 

Sometimes it's hard to find what you're looking for

Cast 
 Ella Connolly as Lucy
 Renée Weldon as Mother
 David Wilmot as Tom
 Joshua Brown as Ben
 Des Fitzgerald as Window Cleaner
 Lauren Stone as Cathy
 Gerard Mannix Flynn as Garda
 Vincent McCabe as DSPCA
 Eliot as Eliot the dog

Production 
Connolly developed and co-wrote the script for Eliot & Me with producer Fiona Bergin. "It was a bit of a family affair', says Connolly "we shot at weekends and school holidays, whenever Ella was free. We cast actors we'd worked with before, like Renée Weldon, David Wilmot and Mannix Flynn. It was a real labour of love. We filmed all over the city, but mainly in Kilmainham.”

Describing working with his daughter Ella he said: “After playing a spooky kid in Hammer horror Wake Wood, she wanted to be in a film she could watch. Having worked on that film which was shot in winter and involved prosthetics and special effects, this was relatively straightforward, She dug deep to play this little girl and to give her a vulnerability and strength in keeping with the story. She was a joy to work with. She did everything in a couple of takes. And I'm not just saying that because I'm her dad. It was fun.”

Twelve-year-old Ella said about the experience "There is an awful lot of waiting around making films. It's not nearly as glamorous as people think. One of the good things about Eliot & Me was working with my dog. He's completely untrained, he hasn't got a clue, he didn't do anything he was asked. I thought that was hilarious. But he is the best thing in the film."

Reception 
Richard Propes described the film as "a warm and gentle family film, featuring a wonderful performance from Ella Connolly and a heart and spirit that will warm dog lovers and family film lovers alike. The film bears an easy comparison to the British made version of Lassie, though that comparison is a tad unfair as Eliot & Me is a delight all its own. Its warm heart and winning spirit will likely breeze through your mind for days after watching the young Connolly and this adorable Yorkshire Terrier."

Accolades 
The film had its world premiere as the opening film at the 52nd Zlín Film Festival in the Czech Republic in May 2012. Subsequently, Eliot & Me was an official selection at the SCHLINGEL International Film Festival in Germany, Cinekid Festival in The Netherlands, Oulu International Children's and Youth Film Festival in Finland and the Olympia International Film Festival for Children and Young People in Greece. In June 2013 Ella Connolly won the Best Actor award at the Dream Fest International Film Festival for Children and Youth in the Romanian town of Slatina. Jury members described Connolly's performance as "very mature and convincing".

Awards
In September 2013 Ella Connolly won two awards for 'Eliot & Me' at the 12th China International Children's Film Festival: the International Jury Award for Best Performance by a Child Actress and the Award for the Children’s Favorite Child Performer. Famous Chinese actress Jiang Wenli chaired the international jury and singled out Ms. Connolly's performance as "compelling and authentic, with a naturalness rare in child acting. Her character was very believable". The second award was voted by the children's jury, which was made up of 200 children from local primary and middle schools.

Music 
The musical score for Eliot & Me was written by Stephen Rennicks.

References

External links 
 Eliot & Me  at the Internet Movie Database
 Eliot & Me Facebook 
 Eliot & Me trailer 
 Eliot & Me stills 
 Fintan Connolly interview 
 Fintan Connolly interview YouTube 
 Eliot & Me official website

English-language Irish films
Films set in Dublin (city)
2012 films
Films about dogs
2010s English-language films